Dennis Ireland (born 19 November 1954) is a former Grand Prix motorcycle road racer from New Zealand. He had his best season in 1979 when he won the 500cc Belgian Grand Prix and finished the year in 14th place in the 500cc world championship. In 1982, Ireland won the Isle of Man TT.

References

External links 
 Dennis Ireland profile at iomtt.com

1954 births
Living people
New Zealand motorcycle racers
500cc World Championship riders
Isle of Man TT riders